MoveMeant is the debut studio album by Swedish-Congolese R&B recording artist Mohombi. It was released on 28 February 2011 on RedOne's joint venture with Universal, 2101 Records. It was preceded by the lead single, "Bumpy Ride" on 24 August 2010. Mohombi has described the sound of the album as R&B music with African influences.

Track listing

Personnel
Credits adapted from the liner notes of MoveMeant.
 RedOne – engineer (tracks 1–4, 6–9), vocal arrangement (tracks 1, 2, 4, 6–10), vocal editing (tracks 1–4, 6–8), background vocals (tracks 1, 2, 4, 6)
 Mohombi – vocal arrangement (track 5), background vocals (tracks 1, 2, 4–7, 10)
 AJ Junior – engineer (tracks 5, 7–9), vocal editing (tracks 5, 7), background vocals (tracks 4, 6, 7)
 Bilal "The Chef" Hajji – background vocals (tracks 4, 6, 7)
 Jimmy Joker – background vocals (track 7)
 Kinnda "Kee" Hamid – background vocals (track 10)
 Giorgio Tuinfort – vocal arrangement, vocal editing, piano (track 10)
 Trevor Muzzy – engineer (tracks 1–3, 5, 6, 8, 10), vocal editing (tracks 1–3, 5–8)
 BeatGeek – engineer (track 7)
 Johnny Powers – vocal editing (track 9)
 Robert Orton – mixing (tracks 1–9)
 Rutger "Rutti" Kroese – mixing (track 10)
 Amit and Naroop – photography

Charts

Release history

References

2011 debut albums
Mohombi albums
Albums produced by RedOne
Albums produced by Polow da Don
Albums produced by Ilya Salmanzadeh